Michelle Leigh Monje-Deisseroth is a neuroscientist and neuro-oncologist. She is a professor of neurology at Stanford University and an investigator with the Howard Hughes Medical Institute. She develops new treatments for diffuse intrinsic pontine glioma.

Early life and education 
Monje wanted to be a physician from the age of five, when she was in kindergarten. She grew up in the San Francisco Bay Area and became interested in biology as a child. Monje was a figure skater during her childhood  and taught figure skating to children with developmental disabilities whilst in Junior High. She was an undergraduate student at Vassar College. Monje studied medicine at Stanford University and earned her MD–PhD in 2004. She completed her internship at Stanford before leaving to join Harvard Medical School as a medical resident in neurology. Monje worked in the Brigham and Women's Hospital as well as the Massachusetts General Hospital. She completed a fellowship at the Stanford University School of Medicine, where she was mentored by Philip A. Beachy, and was board certified in neuro-oncology and neurological subspecialities in 2013.

Research and career 
Her research considers the molecular mechanisms for neurodevelopment and neuroplasticity. She looks at how the neural circuits responsible for cognitive and motor functions are developed, and how the microenvironment of a tumour impacts the transition of precursor cells to diseased cells. She studies brainstem tumours as a paradigm for paediatric gliogenesis. Monje works at Stanford University, where she has developed new treatments for brain cancer since 2011. She has extensively investigated Diffuse Intrinsic Pontine Glioma (DIPG), a cancer for which it is difficult to identify effective chemotherapy and impossible to remove surgically, as the tumour grows in the brainstem. In 2009 she grew the first laboratory cultures of DIPG from deceased donors, which allowed her and her team to monitor the cell's growth and test chemotherapy agents. The tumour tissue resources developed in Monje's laboratory are shared with researchers all around the world. She also uses mouse models to test possible therapies.

Monje is leading a Phase 1 clinical trial of panobinostat, a drug which slows the growth of DIPG and has been shown to increase survival rates in mice. She has also engineered immune cells including the chimeric antigen receptor T (CAR-T) cells to eradicate brain tumours. This work involved screening DIPG tumour cultures for surface molecules that could be targets for CAR-T cells. Monje found that GD2 is present on the surface of 80% of DIPG tumours. Over expression of the sugar molecule is caused by the H3K27M mutation and drives the growth of tumour. Crystal Mackall developed CAR-T cells that attack the GD2, killing cultured DIPG cells which carry the H3K27M mutation. Monje's engineered cells can cross the blood–brain barrier, and have been shown to greatly reduce the number of cancer cells in mice.

She was board certified by the American Board of Psychiatry and Neurology in Neurology in 2018. She was recognised by State senator Jerry Hill with a Certificate of Recognition in June 2019. The campaigning and research of Monje resulted in the United States renaming May 17 as Paediatric Brain Cancer Awareness Day. Her research is supported by family members of children who have suffered from DIPG. Monje serves on the advisory board of Abbie's Army, a non-profit that fights for a cure for DIPG.

She is a recipient of the 2019 Presidential Early Career Award for Scientists and Engineers.

Awards and honors 
 2023 Richard Lounsbery Award
 2021 MacArthur Fellowship
 2021 Member, National Academy of Medicine
 2019 Presidential Early Career Award for Scientists and Engineers
 2017 Neuro-Oncology Investigator Award, American Academy of Neurology

Selected publications 

Monje M.  (July 2018). "Myelin plasticity and nervous system function". Annu Rev Neurosci. 8 (41):61-76. Annu Rev Neurosci. doi: 10.1146/annurev-neuro-080317-061853.

Personal life 
Monje is married to neuroscientist Karl Deisseroth, with whom she has four children.

References 

Living people
Women neurologists
American women neuroscientists
American neuroscientists
American neurologists
People from the San Francisco Bay Area
Vassar College alumni
1978 births
21st-century American women
Recipients of the Presidential Early Career Award for Scientists and Engineers
Members of the National Academy of Medicine